Saint-Guilhem-le-Désert ( or) is a commune in the Hérault department in the Occitanie region in southern France.  Situated where the Gellone river's narrow valley meets the steep-sided gorge of the river Hérault, Saint-Guilhem-le-Désert is essentially a medieval village located on the Chemin de St-Jacques (Way of St. James) pilgrim route to Santiago de Compostella.

Geography
The municipality of Saint-Guilhem covers nearly 40km² in area. 
The town is served by two departmental roads - the D122 and D4. Montpellier, Lodève and Ganges (which stands near the source of the Hérault) are all about 35km away.

The town has retained a medieval appearance. It is located on the borders of the Massif Central, in the middle valley of the Hérault, north of the department of the same name. The territory of the town lies in an intramontane zone formed by the extension of the Séranne mountain and the Cellette mountain a few kilometres from the Garrigues of the plain of Languedoc.

Hydrography
The commune of Saint-Guilhem-le-Désert is drained by the river Hérault and its tributaries Verdus and Ruisseau de la Combe du Bouys.

History
The village has maintained its historic state. Because of its isolation, in 806 Saint Guilhem established the monastery of Gellone here.

In 804, saint Guillaume ('saint Guilhèm' in langue d'oc), the count of Toulouse and Duke of Aquitaine, founded an abbey here at a time when the valley was virtually uninhabited, hence its appellation "desert". The abbey was called The Abbey of Gellone until Guillaume's death in 812, after which it was named The Abbey of Guillaume, and then the Abbey of Saint-Guilhem following his canonization in 1066.

The Abbey of Aniane, nearby, was founded around 782 by a relative of Guillaume.

The abbey became a very important centre of pilgrimage in the middle ages due to a claim that a relic of a piece of the true cross was housed here. The town developed around the abbey.

In the Middle Ages, the abbey fell within the territory of the diocese of Lodeve.

During the French Revolution, the town temporarily bore the name of Verdus-le-Désert.

Landmarks
 The parish church is the former abbey church of the abbey of Gellone where we find the best preserved French organ of Jean-Pierre Cavaillé.
 The cloister of the abbey. A large part of this cloister was sold and dismantled during the French Revolution and exported to the United States,  where some of it is in the New York Cloister Museum.
The town is on the route of the Santiago de Compostela pilgrimage.
 An archaeological museum is housed in the abbey's former refectory. Its collection includes sculptures from the cloister, and the sarcophagi of St. Guilhem and his sisters.
 The tower of the prisons and the castle of the Giant, elements of fortification and defence of the borough.
 The cave of Clamouse, "one of the most beautiful caves in France.

Culture
In summer, the abbey of Saint-Guilhem-le-Désert and the chapel of the Penitents are the venues for concerts, especially those of the Rencontres Musicales of Saint-Guilhem-le-Désert, those of the Friends of Saint-Guilhem-le-Désert. Guilhem and the Camerata Mediterranea.

Population

Miscellaneous
Saint-Guilhem-le-Désert is one of the Plus Beaux Villages de France ("The most beautiful villages of France"), and the Abbey of Gellone, along with the nearby Pont du Diable were designated UNESCO World Heritages sites in 1999.

A part of the cloister of the monastery was moved to The Cloisters museum in New York City.  A new sculpture museum,  containing stone works from the abbey, was dedicated on June 26, 2009. In coordination with this event, a weekend of music and a colloquium was organized in large part by the Camerata Mediterranea.

Gallery

See also
Communes of the Hérault department

References

External links

Official site (French)
Camerata Mediterranea and June, 2009 colloquium

Communes of Hérault
Plus Beaux Villages de France
World Heritage Sites in France
Burial sites of the Carolingian dynasty